Lake Raadi is a lake on the edge of Tartu, Estonia. It was in the grounds of the 18th century Raadi Manor and it is still in the grounds which are open to the public. The grounds were designed by the German landscape artist Peter Joseph Lenné.

Plans of Raadi Manor Park date back to at least the middle of the 18th century.

See also
List of lakes of Estonia

References

External links

Raadi
Tartu
Raadi